William "Billy" Charles de Meuron Wentworth-Fitzwilliam, 7th Earl Fitzwilliam,  (25 July 1872 – 15 February 1943), styled Viscount Milton from 1877 to 1902, was a British Army officer, nobleman, politician, and aristocrat.

Early life and controversy
He was born in Pointe de Meuron, Ontario, Canada, to William Wentworth-Fitzwilliam, Viscount Milton and Laura Beauclerk, granddaughter of William Beauclerk, 8th Duke of St Albans. The unusual circumstances of his birth in a remote part of Canada's frontier lands were later to cause major controversy within the family. The accusation was that he was a changeling: an unrelated baby inserted into the family line, to purge the bloodline of the epilepsy from which his ostensible forebears had suffered, and to provide that arm of the family with a male heir to inherit the earldom.

His birth was registered in Thunder Bay, Ontario, on 20 August 1872. It was noted in the remarks that his parents were visiting the district "for the benefit of the health of the father, Lord Milton."

Biography and career
He sat in the House of Commons for Wakefield from 1895 until 1902, when he inherited the title Earl Fitzwilliam on the death of his grandfather William Wentworth-Fitzwilliam, 6th Earl Fitzwilliam. His father William Wentworth-Fitzwilliam, Viscount Milton had pre-deceased him.

On his succession to the Earldom, he became one of the richest men in Britain, inheriting an estate of significant land, industrial and mineral-right holdings worth £3.3 billion in 2007 terms. His sister Lady Mabel Fitzwilliam criticised his lifestyle: "he had so much and everyone else had so little".

He served 1893–94 as Aide-de-camp to Lord Lansdowne, Viceroy of India. He was promoted to captain of the 4th (Militia) Battalion of the Oxfordshire Light Infantry on 11 April 1896. Following the outbreak of the Second Boer War in late 1899, he volunteered for service with the Imperial Yeomanry where he was commissioned lieutenant on 3 February 1900, serving with the 40th (Oxfordshire) Company in the 10th Battalion. Later that year he received a staff appointment, as captain on the headquarters staff in South Africa.

In May 1902, Lord Fitzwilliam was employed on the staff of the Duke of Connaught, who was in charge of military events during the Coronation of King Edward VII and Queen Alexandra. His main duties were in organizing the auxiliary forces during the celebrations.

He was High Sheriff of Rutland for 1898–99. and Lord Mayor of Sheffield for 1909-10

Family
On 24 June 1896, at St Paul's Cathedral, he married Lady Maud Frederica Elizabeth Dundas (9 July 1877 – 15 March 1967), the daughter of Lawrence Dundas, 1st Marquess of Zetland and Lady Lillian Selina Elizabeth Lumley.  They had five children;

Lady Maud Lillian Elfreda Mary Wentworth-Fitzwilliam (19 August 1898 – 1979), married Archibald Ralph Montagu-Stuart-Wortley-Mackenzie, 3rd Earl of Wharncliffe, on 24 March 1918, and had five children: 
Lady Ann Lavinia Maud Montagu-Stuart-Wortley-Mackenzie (b. 25 January 1919)
Lady Mary Diana Montagu-Stuart-Wortley (2 June 1920 – 19 September 1997), married Henry Pelham-Clinton-Hope, 9th Duke of Newcastle, and had issue 
Lady Barbara Maureen Montagu-Stuart-Wortley-Mackenzie (26 August 1921 – 13 December 2014)
Lady Mary Rosemary Marie-Gabrielle Montagu-Stuart-Wortley-Mackenzie (b. 11 June 1930) 
Alan James Montagu-Stuart-Wortley-Mackenzie, 4th Earl of Wharncliffe (23 March 1935 – 1987)
Lady Marjorie Joan Mary Wentworth-Fitzwilliam (19 October 1900 – 11 September 2001), married twice: on 4 October 1925, to Lt.-Col. Sir Grimond Picton Phillips (marriage dissolved 1949); on 6 October 1949, to Lt.-Col William Wallace Smith Smith-Cuninghame. Lady Joan had one son: 
Griffith William Grismond Phillips (b 19 May 1935)
Lady Donatia Faith Mary Wentworth-Fitzwilliam (14 March 1904 – 20 October 1943), married, on 3 June 1925, to Lt.-Col. Burton William Ellis Gething
Lady Helena Albreda Marie Gabrielle Wentworth-Fitzwilliam (25 May 1907 – 14 September 1970), married twice: on 9 April 1938, to Chetwode Charles Hamilton Hilton-Green; on 16 June 1966, to Edward Greenall, 2nd Baron Daresbury. Lady Helena had one daughter: 
Julia Mary Hamilton Hilton-Green (b. 22 September 1938)
William Henry Lawrence Peter Wentworth-Fitzwilliam, 8th Earl Fitzwilliam (31 December 1910 – 13 May 1948)

Mining and business interests
The family operated coal mines, reputedly employing over 2,000 men at their peak, along with interests in glass, pottery, tar, chemicals and cars. Ongoing real estate investment developed the estate into one of England's most significant landholdings. Nationalization of coal in 1947, coupled with successive death taxes "reduced the estates during the latter half of the twentieth century from over 20,000 to 15,000 acres today."

Earl Fitzwilliam, known as "Billy", ruled with a gentle touch, ensuring the Fitzwilliam collieries were the safest, and that his workers received help during economic blights, including the 1926 General Strike, when he taught miners on pit ponies how to play polo on his front lawn, and fed them during their eight months without pay.

The Countess Maud Fitzwilliam was an avid horsewoman who had also become a champion for pit pony rights, serving as president of the Association for the Prevention of Cruelty to Pit Ponies. She was also a benefactress of mining families working in her husband's collieries.

Death
He died at the family's seat, Wentworth Woodhouse, on 15 February 1943.

References

External links 
 

1872 births
1943 deaths
UK MPs 1895–1900
UK MPs 1900–1906
Fitzwilliam, E7
Lord Mayors of Sheffield
Conservative Party (UK) MPs for English constituencies
Politics of Wakefield
Conservative Party (UK) hereditary peers
High Sheriffs of Rutland
Knights Commander of the Royal Victorian Order
Commanders of the Order of the British Empire
Companions of the Distinguished Service Order
Earls in the Peerage of Great Britain
Earls Fitzwilliam